Limacina retroversa is a species of swimming predatory sea snail in the family Limacinidae, that belongs to the group commonly known as sea butterflies (Thecosomata).

There is one subspecies, Limacina retroversa australis (Eydoux & Souleyet, 1840).

Distribution 
This marine species has a wide distribution:
 North Atlantic Ocean
 Northwest Atlantic Ocean
 European waters
 Mediterranean Sea
 Caribbean Sea
 Cape Verde
 Argentine Sea

Ecology 
The pteropods Clione limacina feed almost entirely on Limacina helicina and Limacina retroversa.

References 

 Abbott, R.T. (1974). American Seashells. 2nd ed. Van Nostrand Reinhold: New York, NY (USA). 663 pp.
 Rosenberg, G. 1992. Encyclopedia of Seashells. Dorset: New York. 224 pp.
 Bleakney, J.S. 1996. Sea slugs of Atlantic Canada and the Gulf of Maine. The Nova Scotia Museum Field Guide Series. Nimbus Publishing. Halifax. 216 p.
 Turgeon, D.D., et al. 1998. Common and scientific names of aquatic invertebrates of the United States and Canada. American Fisheries Society Special Publication 26
 Gofas, S.; Le Renard, J.; Bouchet, P. (2001). Mollusca, in: Costello, M.J. et al. (Ed.) (2001). European register of marine species: a check-list of the marine species in Europe and a bibliography of guides to their identification. Collection Patrimoines Naturels, 50: pp. 180–213 
 Rolán E., 2005. Malacological Fauna From The Cape Verde Archipelago. Part 1, Polyplacophora and Gastropoda.
 Janssen A.W. (2012) Late Quaternary to Recent holoplanktonic Mollusca (Gastropoda) from bottom samples of the eastern Mediterranean Sea: systematics, morphology. Bollettino Malacologico 48 (suppl. 9): 1-105.

Further reading 
 Lebour M. V. (1932). "Limacina retroversa in Plymouth waters". J. mar. biol. Assoc. U.K. (ns)18(1): 123-129, 2 pls.

Limacinidae
Gastropods described in 1823
Molluscs of the Atlantic Ocean
Molluscs of the Mediterranean Sea
Gastropods of Cape Verde